According to the International Hydropower Association, Canada is the fourth largest producer of hydroelectricity in the world in 2021 after the United States, Brazil, and China. In 2014, Canada consumed the equivalent of 85.7 megatonnes worth of oil of hydroelectricity, 9.8% of worldwide hydroelectric consumption. Furthermore, hydroelectricity accounted for 25.7% of Canada's total energy consumption (37.3% of non-oil sources). It is the third-most consumed energy in Canada behind oil and natural gas (30.9% and 28.1% of total consumption, respectively).

Some provinces and territories, such as British Columbia, Manitoba, Newfoundland and Labrador, Quebec and Yukon produce over 90% of their electricity from Hydro. All of the dams with large reservoirs were completed before 1990, since then most development has been run-of-the-river, both large and small. Natural Resources Canada calculates the current installed small hydro capacity is 3,400 MW, with an estimated potential of 15,000 MW. A report on the future of hydroelectricity, suggests the remaining 40% potential will remain undeveloped up to 2050, citing a lack of public acceptance. The widespread usage of hydroelectricity, including being incorporated into electric utility names such as Toronto Hydro or BC Hydro, has led to "hydro" being used in some parts of Canada to refer to electricity in general, regardless of source.

As of 2019, Canada had 81 GW of installed hydroelectric capacity, producing about 400 TWh of electricity.

By region

British Columbia
BC Hydro owns and operates the majority of hydroelectric installations in British Columbia. A second crown corporation, Columbia Power Corporation and two companies also own large dams in BC, Alcan's Kemano Project and FortisBC.

90% of BC Hydro's generation is produced by hydroelectric means. Natural gas and biomass thermal power round out the generation portfolio.

Over 80% of BC Hydro's installed in generating capacity is at hydroelectric installations in the Peace and Columbia river basins. The GM Shrum and Peace Canyon generating stations are on the Peace River produced 29% of BC Hydro's electricity requirements. In the Columbia River Basin, Mica and Revelstoke hydroelectric plants together contributed 25%, while Kootenay Canal and Seven Mile generating stations together supplied 10%.

The remaining 25 hydroelectric generating stations supplied 14% of electricity production. BC Hydro also operates thermal power plants. The Burrard Thermal Generating Station contributes 7.5% and the remaining 14.5% of the electricity requirement was supplied by purchases and other transactions.

BC Hydro's last dam was completed in 1984, since then run-of-the-river projects with private partners have been built. Power production without reservoirs varies dramatically through the year, so older dams with large reservoirs, retain water and average out capacity. As of 2012, there were approximately 40 small hydro sites generating 750 MW. By 2014 various companies have built a total of 100 run of the river projects under 50 MW. In 2014 they produced 18,000 GWh from 4,500 MW of capacity.

Manitoba Hydro
As of March 31, 2018, Manitoba Hydro serves a peak Manitoba electrical load of 5,648 megawatts. Electrical supply to Manitoba customers was 22.5 terawatt-hours in fiscal 2017, with total revenue due to electricity of $1.464 billion CAD. Extraprovincial sales totaled $437 million in 2017-18 and were at 9.448 terawatt-hours, with normal water flows. The company also delivered 2.048 billion cubic metres of natural gas in 2017–18, which contributed $346 million CAD to revenues. As of early 2020, around 97% of the electricity generation in Manitoba comes from hydroelectricity. The new Keeyask Station on the Nelson River was completed in 2021-2022.

Newfoundland and Labrador
Newfoundland and Labrador Hydro's installed generating capacity, 7775 megawatts (MW), 92 percent hydroelectric, is the third largest of all utility companies in Canada. The new Lower Churchill Project with a total generating capacity of 824 MW was completed between 2020 and 2022.

Northwest Territories
The Northwest Territories has an installed hydroelectric generating capacity of 55 MW, supplying electricity to the North Slave and South Slave electricity grids. Each grid operates independently and is not connected to the electrical grid in the rest of Canada.

Ontario
Ontario Power Generation (OPG) Produces 50% of the electricity used in the province, 40% from hydroelectric, 10% from nuclear-powered facilities, 30% from solar, and 20% from biomass. OPG uses thermal plants that burn biomass and natural gas with a generating capacity of 2,458 MW; these plants were not used in 2015.

After a provincial government commitment to phase out all coal generating plants, two units at Nanticoke were shut down in fall 2010. Another two were shut down in 2011. The final four were shut down on December 31, 2013.

Most of Ontario's large hydroelectric sites were exploited in the early 20th century, which limits exenstive expansion from occurring within the province. Nonetheless, efforts by the Government of Canada in collaboration with hydropower entities to expand and maintain hydroelectric resources have been put in motion. This is partly driven by the fact that Ontario is forecasted to have a 60 TWh increase in net energy demand by 2043.

Possible Expansion in Northern Ontario

Ontario's current hydroelectricity stations are mainly located in southern Ontario. On January 26th, 2022, Todd Smith, the Ontario Minister of Energy requested an analysis report from IESO in support of a voluntary clean energy credit registry for Ontario citizens. According to the report requirements outlined in the letter, the registry would include credit offerings that based from existing, non-emitting generation such as nuclear, waterpower, wind, solar, and bioenergy. CECs are claimable credits that represent one megawatt hour of clean energy.

On February 9th, 2023, a report titled Made in Ontario Northern Hydroelectric Opportunities: Securing a Clean Energy  was created by Ontario Power Generation (OPG) in collaboration with the Ontario Waterpower Association. In response to Todd Smith's letter. The report claimed that the estimated hydroelectric potential in northern Ontario is 3000-4000 Megawatts. The document also provided the following locations as possible sites for hydroelectric development:

 Little Jackfish River in northwestern Ontario.
 Mattagami, Moose, and Abitibi Rivers in northeastern Ontario.
 Severn and Windigo Rivers in northern Ontario.
 Albany and Attawapiskat Rivers in northern Ontario.

Little Jack River in particular had been an OPG ongoing project since 2011, but had been put on hold as energy demands at that time were insufficient. However, with forecasted new demands, the revival of the project may be considered feasible by the Government of Canada.

Opposition to Expansion

While the instalment of hydroelectric stations in northern Ontario could potentially meet rising energy demands, public concerns over the environmental damage caused by hydroelectric activities are present. The Ontario River Alliance opposes the creation of new hydroelectric facilities in Ontario, insisting that labeling hydroelectric power as a non-emitting source for CRCs is misinformation and that dams do generate greenhouse gasses from the biomass that accumulates behind them.

Quebec
Hydro-Québec's extensive network of 61 hydroelectric dams have a combined capacity of 38,400 megawatts, accounting for over half of the Canadian total. Hydropower accounts for 95.73% of the supply sold by the Quebec Crown-owned utility. Five of Hydro-Québec's hydroelectric facilities are rated above 2,000 MW — the Manic-5, La Grande-4, La Grande-3 La Grande-2-A and Robert-Bourassa stations — while 7 others have a capacity of over 1,000 megawatts.

New projects

The proposed Gull Island facility would consist of a generation station with a capacity of 2,250 MW after 2023.

The Romaine River project in Quebec started construction in 2009 and will have a capacity of 1550 MW by 2023.

The Site C dam on the Peace River in British Columbia will have a capacity of 1100 MW in 2025.

International comparison

Gallery

See also

List of electrical generating stations in Canada
Renewable energy in Canada
Wind power in Canada
Solar power in Canada
Geothermal power in Canada
Renewable energy by country

References

External links
 A View of Canadian Hydroelectric Generation Markets - 2016

Further reading
Desbiens, Caroline. Power from the North: Territory, Identity, and the Culture of Hydroelectricity in Quebec (2014)
Froschauer, Karl.  White gold: Hydroelectric Power in Canada. (Vancouver: UBC Press, 1999) excerpt and text search